Larry Holley (June 28, 1945 – May 12, 2022) was an American college basketball coach. He was the head men's basketball coach at his alma mater, William Jewell College in Liberty, Missouri. His 919 career wins made him one of only 10 four-year college coaches (National Collegiate Athletic Association (NCAA) and National Association of Intercollegiate Athletics (NAIA)) to amass 900 career wins. He ranks first all-time in career wins among four-year, college coaches coaching only at Missouri colleges and universities.

Holley's teams won 20 games in a season 24 times and have posted both a 45-game conference winning streak and a 43-game home court winning streak.

He received 14 Coach of the Year awards and was elected to the Greater Kansas City Basketball Coaches Hall of Fame, the Missouri Basketball Coaches Hall of Fame, the NAIA Hall of Fame and the William Jewell College Athletic Hall of Fame.

Holley joined William Jewell as head men's basketball coach for the 1979–80 season after coaching four years at Northwest Missouri State University, six years at Central Methodist University and one year at Harrisburg, Missouri High School. 

He was a native of Jameson, Missouri.

Head coaching record

See also
 List of college men's basketball coaches with 600 wins

References

External links
 William Jewell profile

1945 births
2022 deaths
Central Methodist Eagles men's basketball coaches
College men's basketball head coaches in the United States
High school basketball coaches in the United States
Northwest Missouri State Bearcats men's basketball coaches
People from Daviess County, Missouri
William Jewell Cardinals men's basketball coaches
William Jewell Cardinals men's basketball players
American men's basketball players
Basketball coaches from Missouri
Basketball players from Missouri